Sunwoo Jung-a (Hangul: 선우정아, born May 11, 1985), is a South Korean musician, singer-songwriter, and record producer who has worked with numerous Korean artists including IU, Suran (singer), GD & TOP, 2NE1, Lee Haeri, Lee Hi, and San E. She released her debut album, Masstige, on May 10, 2006.

Discography

Studio albums

Extended plays

Singles

Other charted songs

Soundtrack appearances

Production credits

Filmography

TV Program

Web series

Awards and nominations

References

1985 births
Living people
South Korean rhythm and blues singers
South Korean pop singers
21st-century South Korean women singers
Seonu clan of Taiyuan